The Volta River Authority (VRA) is the main generator and supplier of electricity in Ghana. They are also the responsible for the maintenance of the hydro power supply plant.

Establishment 
The VRA was established by the Volta River Development Act, Act 46 of the Republic of Ghana on 26 April 1961.

The main purpose of the VRA is to generate and supply electricity for Ghana's needs. It is also responsible for managing the environmental impact of the creation of the Volta Lake on the towns and people bordering the lake. The VRA maintains a national energy supply grid and although it started with hydroelectric power, it is now branching into other types of energy such as thermal energy. The company represents Ghana in the West African Power Pool.

Power generation 
Akosombo Hydroelectric Project
Kpong Dam
Takoradi Power Station
 Navrongo Solar Power Plant
 Tema Power Station
 Kpone Power Station

Other projects 
Schools
Health services
Environmental and Resettlement activities

Subsidiary companies 
Volta Hotel
Volta Lake Transport Company (VLTC)
 Kpong Farms
 Northern Electricity Distribution Company (NEDCo)
 VRA Property Holding Company (VRA PROPCo)
 VRA Health Services Limited
 VRA Schools

See also 

Electricity sector in Ghana
Ministry of Energy (Ghana)
Osagyefo Barge

References

External links 
Official website

 
Government-owned companies of Ghana
Electric power companies of Ghana
1961 establishments in Ghana
Energy companies established in 1961